Joshua Luke Haynes (born 13 February 1999) is an English former first-class cricketer.

The son of the cricketer Gavin Haynes, he was born at Kidderminster in February 1999. He was educated at Malvern College, before going up to the University of Leeds. While studying at Leeds, he played two first-class cricket matches for Leeds/Bradford MCCU against Derbyshire and Yorkshire in 2019. He scored 38 runs in his two matches with a high score of 20, while with slow left-arm orthodox bowling, he took 4 wickets with best figures of 3 for 37. His brother, Jack, plays county cricket for Worcestershire.

References

External links

1999 births
Living people
People from Kidderminster
People educated at Malvern College
Alumni of Leeds Beckett University
English cricketers
Leeds/Bradford MCCU cricketers